Mark Watson may refer to:

 Mark Watson (born 1980), English stand-up comedian and novelist.
 Mark Watson (archaeologist) (1906–1979), British diplomat and archaeologist
 Mark Watson (Australian footballer), winner of the 1987 Sandover Medal
 Mark Watson (baseball) (born 1974), American former Major League Baseball pitcher
 Mark Watson (economist) (born 1952), professor of econometrics at Princeton University
 Mark Watson (footballer, born 1973), retired English football forward
 Mark Watson (military officer), Commodore, Royal Canadian Navy, Director General of Morale and Welfare Services
 Mark Watson (sculptor) (born 1949), American sculptor
 Mark Watson (soccer, born 1970), Canadian soccer player
 Mark E. Watson III (born 1964), American entrepreneur
 Mark S. Watson (1887–1966), American editor and correspondent
 Mark Watson-Gandy (born 1967), British barrister, UK law professor, author, company chairman, founder of KidsMBA